Carey Price (born August 16, 1987) is a Canadian professional ice hockey goaltender under contract for the Montreal Canadiens of the National Hockey League (NHL). He is considered to be one of the best goaltenders in the world by many colleagues, fans, The Hockey News, and EA Sports; and one of the greatest goaltenders in the history of the Montreal Canadiens by several media outlets. As of the end of the 2021–22 NHL season, Price is the winningest goaltender in Canadiens history with 361 wins. 

Beginning his junior career with the Tri-City Americans in the Western Hockey League in 2002, Price was drafted fifth overall by the Montreal Canadiens in the 2005 NHL Entry Draft following his second season with the Tri-City Americans. Following a further two seasons with the Americans, where he won both the Del Wilson Trophy as the top goaltender in the Western Hockey League (WHL) and CHL Goaltender of the Year in his final season of major junior in 2007. Joining the Canadiens' farm team, the Hamilton Bulldogs of the American Hockey League (AHL) just as the Calder Cup playoffs begun, Price led the Bulldogs to the Calder Cup championship, winning the Jack A. Butterfield Trophy as the tournament MVP. Price made the Canadiens roster for the 2007–08 season as the backup goaltender before ultimately becoming the starting goaltender later that season. In 2015, he won the Ted Lindsay Award, William M. Jennings Trophy, Vezina Trophy, and Hart Trophy, becoming the first goaltender in NHL history to win all four individual awards in the same season. In 2021, Price led the Canadiens to their first Stanley Cup Finals appearance since 1993 before eventually losing to the Tampa Bay Lightning in five games.

Internationally, Price has represented Canada at various tournaments at junior levels, winning silver medals at the World U-17 Hockey Challenge in 2004 and the IIHF World U18 Championship in 2005. He won a gold medal at the 2007 World Junior Ice Hockey Championships in Sweden. In 2014, Price was named to the Canadian Olympic Hockey Team and led the Canadian team to a gold medal at the 2014 Winter Olympics in Sochi, posting a .972 save percentage and 0.59 goals against average across 5 games in the process. Price's splendid play earned him the tournament's top goaltending award, from the International Ice Hockey Federation (IIHF) directorate. In 2016, Price went undefeated en route to winning the 2016 World Cup of Hockey.

Early life
Carey Price was born in Vancouver to Lynda and Jerry Price. His mother is the chief of the Ulkatcho First Nation. His father was also a goaltender and drafted by the Philadelphia Flyers 126th overall in the 1978 NHL Amateur Draft. Although Jerry never played in the NHL, he did play four seasons of professional hockey in various leagues and was for a time the goaltending coach of the Tri-City Americans. Price has a younger sister, Kayla, and is second cousins with former professional ice hockey player Shane Doan.

When Price was three, his family moved to the remote town of Anahim Lake in central British Columbia where he was raised. Having to make the ten-hour round trip three days a week, Carey's father eventually bought a Piper PA-28 Cherokee to fly him to practice and games.

Playing career

Tri-City Americans
Price made his first appearance in the Western Hockey League (WHL) in a single game for the Tri-City Americans during the 2002–03 season. He then made the Tri-City roster the next season, appearing in 28 games as the backup for Colorado Avalanche prospect Tyler Weiman, posting a 2.38 Goals against average (GAA) and .915 save percentage. The next season, Price took over as the primary starter of the team and established himself as a top goaltender, playing in a league-high 63 games with a 2.34 GAA and .920 save percentage and eight shutouts, both in the league top ten. Ranking as the best North American goaltender by NHL Central Scouting, Price was drafted fifth overall by the Montreal Canadiens, a move considered surprising by many who thought Price would not be drafted until the middle of the first round.

During the 2005–06 season, Price's play in Tri-City suffered considerably and he ended the season with a 2.87 GAA and a .906 save percentage while starting 55 games. Price rebounded the next season with a very strong 2006–07 season, posting an excellent 2.45 GAA and .917 save percentage while winning both the Del Wilson Trophy as the top WHL goaltender and the CHL Goaltender of the Year award. Despite this, the Americans were eliminated in six games during the 2007 playoffs.

Hamilton Bulldogs

Following Tri-City's early playoff exit, later that spring, Price joined the Montreal Canadiens farm team, the Hamilton Bulldogs, just before the start of the 2007 Calder Cup playoffs. In two regular season appearances with the Bulldogs, Price allowed only three goals and won one game. Price led the Bulldogs on a remarkable run that spring, defeating the Hershey Bears four games to one in the finals as the team won their first Calder Cup. Price became only the third teenage goaltender to win the Jack A. Butterfield Trophy as AHL playoff MVP, posting a 2.06 GAA and .936 save percentage.

Montreal Canadiens (2007–present)

2007–2013: Early career

Price made his highly anticipated Canadiens debut on October 10, 2007, against the Pittsburgh Penguins and recorded 26 saves in a 3–2 win. After the first month of the season, he was awarded the Canadiens' Molson Cup for October, given to the player with the most first-star selections. Although reassigned to the Hamilton Bulldogs midway through the season in January, he was called back up shortly over a month later. With the trading of starting goaltender Cristobal Huet to the Washington Capitals before the trading deadline, Price assumed the starting role for the Canadiens. He was subsequently named the NHL Rookie of the Month for March and the NHL First Star of the Week (ending April 6, 2008) as the Canadiens finished first overall in the Eastern Conference and earned their first division title since 1991–92. Price completed the regular season leading all rookie goaltenders in wins (24), save percentage (.920) and shutouts (3). He was named to the NHL All-Rookie Team in recognition for his accomplishments in his first year in the NHL.

Entering the playoffs against the Boston Bruins, Price recorded a 1–0 win on April 15, 2008, becoming the first Canadiens rookie to post a playoff shutout since Patrick Roy in 1986. He would go on to record another shutout in game seven to eliminate Boston. Montreal lost in the second round to the Philadelphia Flyers, with Price losing three of the last four games.

After a strong start to the 2008–09 season, in which he earned a second Molson Cup in November, Price injured his ankle on December 30, 2008. Forced out of action for nearly a month, during which he was voted in as a starting goaltender for the 2009 NHL All-Star Game in Montreal (along with teammates Alexei Kovalev, Andrei Markov and Mike Komisarek) he made his return to action on January 20, 2009, after backup Jaroslav Halák was pulled in a 4–2 loss to the Atlanta Thrashers. Going into the 2009 playoffs as the eighth and final seed, the Canadiens played the Boston Bruins in the opening round for the second consecutive season. They were swept in four games, with the Bruins scoring at least four times in each game. In the final game at the Bell Centre in Montreal, Price surrendered four goals in two periods. After stopping a weak dump-in, the crowd cheered sarcastically and Price responded by putting his arms up in the air, similar to Patrick Roy's gesture on December 2, 1995, in a game after which Roy requested a trade from the Canadiens.

Price struggled throughout the 2009–10 season, winning only 13 games and losing the starting job to Halák as the Canadiens entered the playoffs as the eighth and final seed. Although the Canadiens made a surprise run to the Eastern Conference final, upsetting both the Washington Capitals and Pittsburgh Penguins along the way, Price appeared in only four games, losing one and getting no decision in each of the others, only coming off the bench when the game was out of hand. The highlight of the season for Price was stopping 37 of 38 shots in a 5–1 win over the Boston Bruins in the Canadiens' 100 year anniversary game on December 4, 2009, and the low point was surrendering four goals in his only start of the playoffs. In the 2010 off-season, both Price and Halák became restricted free agents and a goaltending debate emerged in Montreal over who would remain with the team – the playoff hero Halák or the younger Price. After weeks of media speculation, the Canadiens chose Price, trading Halák to the St. Louis Blues and re-signing Price to a two-year, $5.5 million contract to return to his role as starting goaltender.

The 2010–11 pre-season was a tough start for Price. During the 2010–11 regular season, however, Price played in 72 games recording new career highs including 38 wins, eight shutouts a 2.35 GAA and a .923 save percentage, and was selected to play in the 2011 NHL All-Star Game. This play from Price allowed the Canadiens to enter the 2011 Stanley Cup playoffs. This strong play continued for Price in the playoffs posting a .935 save percentage. It was not enough, however, to lead the Canadiens to victory, as they ultimately fell in seven games in the first round to the Boston Bruins. On October 26, 2011, Price earned his 100th win in his NHL career in his 214th game. A few months later, he participated to his third All-Star Game. The 2011–12 season, however, did not go well for the Canadiens, and they missed the playoffs for the first time since the 2006–07 season. Price missed the last four games of the season due to a concussion.

On July 2, 2012, Price re-signed with the Canadiens on a six-year contract worth US$39 million.

During the lockout-shortened 2012–13 season, Price started the year very well, winning 18 of his first 28 starts as the Canadiens, in stark contrast to the previous season, were one of the best teams in the Eastern Conference, going 29–14–5, good enough for second in the conference. Price's play, however, dropped off in the final weeks of the season, going 2–6 and allowing 27 goals. Nonetheless, the Canadiens went into the playoffs against the seventh seeded Ottawa Senators. In Game 4, with the score tied 2–2 as the third period came to an end, Price suffered a groin injury and did not return for the overtime period and was replaced by Peter Budaj; the Senators would go on to score and win the game. Price's injury sidelined him for the rest of the series and the Canadiens were eliminated in five games. Price ended the playoffs with a sub-par 3.26 GAA and an .894 save percentage.

2013–2014: Eastern Conference Final run

The 2013–14 season saw Price return to form, recording 34 wins to go along with a career best 2.32 GAA and .927 save percentage, leading the Canadiens to their second 100-point season since the 2007–08 season. The Canadiens entered the 2014 Stanley Cup playoffs as the fourth seed in the Eastern Conference against the Tampa Bay Lightning, whom they swept in four games, marking Price's first playoff series win since his rookie year. The Montreal Canadiens then faced the Presidents' Trophy-winning Boston Bruins in the second round for the fourth time of Price's NHL career. In contrast to the previous two postseason meetings, the Canadiens upset the Bruins, ousting them in seven games. Following a 4–2 defeat in Game 5 at TD Garden, Price shut out the Bruins in Game 6 by a score of 4–0 before stopping 29 shots in a 3–1 victory in Game 7 to eliminate Boston and advance to the Conference Finals. His and the Canadiens' run, however, ended against the New York Rangers. In Game 1 at the Bell Centre, with the Rangers up 2–0 near the end of the second period, Rangers forward Chris Kreider crashed into Price. He would stay in net for the remainder of the period, allowing two more goals before the intermission. Price was then replaced by backup Peter Budaj in the third period as the Rangers scored three more goals to hammer the Canadiens 7–2 in Game 1. Price was soon ruled out for the rest of the series with an unspecified lower-body injury, as the Canadiens fell in six games to the Rangers, the second year in-a-row Price had a premature ending to his playoffs due to injury.

2014–2017: Hart and Vezina Trophies
Price would follow up 2014–15 with the best season of his career, as he would finish the season as the leader of the three leading categories for goaltenders: GAA (1.96), save percentage (.933), and wins (44), all career highs as he would help the Canadiens win the Atlantic Division. That season he would go on to win the Hart Memorial Trophy as the league's most valuable player, the Vezina Trophy as best goaltender, the Ted Lindsay Award as most valuable player as voted by the NHLPA, and the William M. Jennings Trophy for fewest goals allowed (in a tie with Corey Crawford of the Chicago Blackhawks with 189 goals allowed). He became only the second player in franchise history to win 4 awards in one season.

Early in the 2015–16 season, Price suffered a knee injury. At the time of the injury, he was expected to return after six weeks. However, on April 6, 2016, the Canadiens announced that Price would not return for the remainder of the season. The extent of Price's injury was revealed to be a medial collateral ligament injury (MCL sprain).

At the beginning of the 2016–17 season, Price would set a record for most consecutive wins to start a season with 10 (later be surpassed by Jack Campbell of the Toronto Maple Leafs in the 2020–21 season).

On July 2, 2017, it was announced that Price signed an eight-year contract extension with an annual cap hit of US$10.5 million totaling to US$84 million for the entire contract. His new contract will run through the 2025–26 season. This made Price the highest paid goaltender in the 2018–2019 NHL season, surpassing goaltender Henrik Lundqvist.

2017–2020: Injury and career milestones
After a dismal month at the start of the 2017–18 season, Price left the lineup due to a minor lower body injury, leaving goaltenders Al Montoya and Charlie Lindgren to take his place. On February 22, 2018, Price was ruled out indefinitely after sustaining a concussion in a game against the Philadelphia Flyers. On March 19, 2018, Price returned from his concussion and dressed for the first time in 13 games for a game against the Florida Panthers. Despite his injuries, Price made in his 557th career NHL start for the Canadiens on April 3, 2018, surpassing the previous franchise record holder Jacques Plante.

On October 27, 2018, after a 3–0 win over the Boston Bruins, Price surpassed Patrick Roy for second place in Canadiens franchise career wins with his 290th career victory. Price was named to the 2019 National Hockey League All-Star Game, his sixth All-Star nomination, but he chose to defer due to a lower-body injury.

On March 12, 2019, with a 3–1 victory over the Detroit Red Wings, Price surpassed Jacques Plante for first place in Canadiens franchise career wins with his 315th.

2020–2021: Pandemic seasons and Stanley Cup Final
For the 2019–20 season, Price played 58 games in the regular season, recording a disappointing .909 save percentage.  Due to the COVID-19 pandemic, however, the regular season was ended prematurely. Price's presence on the Canadiens' lineup became a point of discussion in the media during the NHL's debates on the format for the belated 2020 Stanley Cup playoffs, which were to be held in an expanded format that allowed the Canadiens to participate for the first time in three years. The Canadiens were scheduled to play a qualifying round against the Pittsburgh Penguins, and it was reported that the Penguins had objected to the idea of a best-of-three series on the basis that Price's presence gave the Canadiens an unfair advantage relative to their regular season performance. The Penguins publicly denied this subsequently. Ultimately a best-of-five format was chosen instead. The Canadiens defeated the Penguins 3–1 in the qualifying round, with Price recording a .947 save percentage. The team went on to lose the first round to the Philadelphia Flyers 4 games to 2.

With pandemic restrictions and effects still in place, the NHL arranged for all teams to play exclusively within realigned divisions for the 2020–21 season, with all Canadian teams playing in the newly formed North Division. Towards the end of the season, Price sustained a concussion on April 20th after a collision with Alex Chiasson of the Edmonton Oilers. As part of his return to the ice, he played a game with the Canadiens' AHL affiliate the Laval Rocket on May 17. Price finished the regular season with an underwhelming .901 save percentage and 2.64 goals against average as the Canadiens clinched the final seed in the playoffs.

Price would see notable statistical improvements throughout the playoffs while the Canadiens advanced to their first Stanley Cup Final in 28 years. The Canadiens beat the Toronto Maple Leafs in seven games by overcoming a 3–1 series deficit in round 1, then swept the Winnipeg Jets in round 2, and finally defeated the Vegas Golden Knights four games to two in the semifinals to win the Clarence S. Campbell Bowl.  Price was widely cited as the most important player in the Canadiens' deep run to the Final. When asked about the difference between Price's regular and post-season performances in recent years, then-Canadiens general manager Marc Bergevin remarked "I guess the expression we could use he's a big-game player. He rises to the occasion. He does extremely well under pressure."

In the Stanley Cup Finals against the Tampa Bay Lightning, Price and the Canadiens lost the first three games, but won Game 4 in overtime to avoid getting swept. Price made 32 saves in the win and then 29 saves in Game 5, which the Canadiens lost 1–0 as the Lightning won their second-consecutive Stanley Cup title.

2021 Expansion Draft
With the arrival of the Seattle Kraken as the League's thirty-second team, the 2021 NHL Expansion Draft was scheduled. As each team was only allowed to protect one goaltender and Price had a contractual guarantee of protection in such situations, it was widely assumed that the Kraken would select Price's backup Allen on the basis of his strong performance in the previous season and economical contract. In a major surprise, Price proposed to waive his no movement clause so the Canadiens could instead protect Allen, with the team's calculation being that the Kraken would opt not to take up Price's contract due to its cap hit and duration.

Ultimately, the Kraken declined the opportunity to select Price, and selected defenseman Cale Fleury from the Canadiens instead. The Athletic remarked afterward that "now that Seattle has taken a pass, the reality that Price will play his entire career in a Canadiens uniform seems impossible to refute."

2021–present: Health struggles
Price underwent knee surgery in July 2021 and was initially expected to be ready to begin the season on October 13. However, on October 7 it was announced by the Canadiens that Price would be entering the NHL/NHLPA Player Assistance Program, established to help NHL players and their families deal with substance abuse, mental health, and other personal challenges. On November 9, 2021, Price rejoined his Canadiens teammates and went on to release a statement explaining his leave, revealing that he made the decision to enter a residential treatment facility for substance abuse following "years of neglecting [his] own mental health".

Following his departure from the player assistance program, Price embarked on an extended rehabilitation of his knee, a process that lasted months past what was initially expected and involved multiple setbacks. In his absence, the Canadiens, plagued by injuries to other players, fell to the bottom of the league standings. Team owner Geoff Molson sacked general manager Bergevin, and subsequently coach Dominique Ducharme was removed as well, replaced by Martin St. Louis, a former teammate of Price's on the 2014 Canadian Olympic team. In early April, it was announced that Price would travel with the team to away games against New Jersey and Toronto, but would not play in either. After days of speculation, it was confirmed that he would make his first start on April 15 against the New York Islanders, the Canadiens' seventy-fifth game of the season. In his return, he gave up 2 goals on 20 shots in a 3–0 loss to the Islanders. After three additional games, Price consulted with his New York-based specialist on continued knee inflammation, but said "there were no real questions answered for me." He returned to the net for the Canadiens' final game of the season, a 10–2 rout of the Florida Panthers for his only win of the season. Price indicated that he would seek further answers over the summer. Addressing the possibility that the season-ender was his final game with the team, he said "if it is it, that would be a great way to do it."

Price was named a finalist for the Bill Masterton Memorial Trophy, awarded to the player who "best exemplifies the qualities of perseverance, sportsmanship and dedication to hockey." On winning the award, he observed "there's obstacles in life that will always challenge you, and I think having the ability to overcome those and keep things in perspective and keep moving forward is something that we should all be teaching our children and loved ones."

On August 18, 2022, Canadiens general manager Kent Hughes announced that Price was unlikely to play during the 2022–23 season, and that if he were to return at all, it would likely require additional surgery. Price later disclosed in an interview with The Athletic that the contemplated surgery was an osteochondral autograft transfer, but that the odds of success were such that it was unlikely he would pursue it, given the risk to his daily quality of life were it not to succeed.

International play

Price made his international debut for Canada at the 2005 IIHF World U18 Championships in the Czech Republic. He appeared in four games, earning a silver medal as Team Canada was defeated by the United States 5–1 in the gold medal game. Two years later, in his final year of major junior, Price was named to Team Canada for the 2007 World Junior Championships in Sweden. He led Team Canada to a third consecutive gold medal and was named Tournament MVP and Top Goaltender after going 6–0 with two shutouts, a 1.14 GAA and .961 save percentage. He was also named to the Tournament All-Star team along with teammates Jonathan Toews and Kris Letang. He led the 2005 IIHF world U18 Championships in save percentage and wins. Price sold his U18 Championship helmet for charity.

On January 7, 2014, Price was named to the 2014 Canadian Olympic Hockey Team along with goaltenders Mike Smith of the Phoenix Coyotes and Roberto Luongo of the Vancouver Canucks. Price, along with close friend and teammate P. K. Subban, became the first Montreal Canadiens players to be selected for Team Canada since Mark Recchi in the 1998 Nagano Olympics. Soon after arriving in Sochi, it was announced that Price would start in Canada's first game of the tournament against Norway. Price had a strong debut, stopping 18 of 19 shots against Norway in a 3–1 Canadian win. Price's strong play continued, allowing only a single goal in a 2–1 victory against Finland in the round-robin tournament. In Canada's quarter-final game, Price backstopped Canada over Latvia 2–1. On February 21, 2014, Price played a pivotal role in a 1–0 victory against Team USA in the semifinals. Price stopped all 31 shots and shutout Team USA, powering Team Canada into the gold medal game against Sweden. In his second consecutive shutout of the Olympics, Price made 24 saves in a 3–0 victory and won his first gold medal as an Olympian. Price ended the tournament undefeated in five games with a 0.59 GAA and .971 save percentage and was named the tournament's best goaltender by the International Ice Hockey Federation (IIHF).

Playing style
Like many modern goaltenders, Price uses the "butterfly hybrid" technique, a mix of "stand-up" and "butterfly style" goaltending. Using this style, Price will stay on his feet for high shots, and drop to his knees, pointing his skates outwards with his pads covering the bottom width of the net. Price has been lauded by his teammates and opponents alike for his exceptionally calm demeanor on the ice, with 2014 Olympic teammate and Los Angeles Kings defenseman Drew Doughty proclaiming Price as being "the calmest goalie [he] played in front of." Price's methodical and calm approach to the play often allows him to make difficult saves look mundane and routine. Price is considered by the Canadiens' management and coaches to be one of the leaders of the team and is present during meetings with the team's captain and alternate captains.

Philanthropy

In 2015, Price teamed up with CCM to donate $10,000 worth of equipment to a minor hockey league in Williams Lake, B.C. Since 2014, Price has been an ambassador to the Breakfast Club of Canada which aims to provide all children across Canada with nutritious meals. 

During the 2019 NHL Awards, Price, together with model Camille Kostek, presented hockey fan Anderson Whitehead the Feel Good Moment Award. Whitehead's mother always wanted her son to meet the goaltender but was not able to arrange it before she died from cancer in November 2018.

Personal life
Price, who is of Ulkatcho First Nation descent through his mother, was named as an honorary co-chair at the 2010 National Aboriginal Hockey Championships that were held in Ottawa, Ontario, in May 2010. Price is of the Nuxalk and Southern Carrier Aboriginal heritage.

Price met his wife, Angela, while playing with the Tri-City Americans. In an interview, Angela said that the couple were set up on a blind date by her friend, who was dating Carey's roommate at the time. They live in Kelowna, British Columbia during the off-season. They were married on August 24, 2013 in Benton City, Washington, near Angela's hometown of Kennewick. The next day, Price flew to Calgary for Hockey Canada's Olympic orientation camp for the 2014 Winter Olympics. On October 21, 2015, Angela Price stated on her blog that they were expecting their first child the following spring. In 2016, Angela gave birth to the couple's first child, a girl named Liv. In December 2018, Angela gave birth to their second daughter, named Millie. In June 2020, Angela announced they were expecting their third child in the fall. In October 2020, Angela gave birth to their third child, a boy named Lincoln.

In an October 2022 exclusive interview with The Athletic's Arpon Basu as part of a series which ranked the Top 100 players in modern NHL history (with Price ranking 88th) Price opened up about his experience a year prior which led to his admission to the NHLPA Player Assistance Program. It was revealed that Price experienced struggles with alcoholism, which initially began as an escape from the stresses of being a professional athlete but was further exacerbated following the Canadiens loss in the 2021 Stanley Cup Finals and the complications surrounding his knee surgery. Particularly citing the severity of substance abuse within the Indigenous community and upon reflections of his own mental wellbeing, Price made the decision to voluntarily enter a residential rehabilitation facility. Price hopes his willingness to talk about his experience serves as an example and inspires others that "it's OK to ask for help."

Price is an avid outdoorsman and often camps and hunts in his free time. In December 2022, Price released a statement opposing a proposed Canadian Federal Bill which would amend gun control legislation. Price later apologized to the victims of the École Polytechnique massacre for the timing of his comments, which came three days before the 33rd anniversary of the attack.

Career statistics
Bold numbers indicate league leader.

Regular season and playoffs

International

Awards

Multiple honours
 Molson Cup for Montreal Canadiens: 2009, 2011, 2012, 2013, 2014, 2015, 2017, 2019
 NHL All-Star Game: 2009, 2011, 2012, 2015, 2017, 2018, 2019

2007
 IIHF World U20 Championship gold medal (2007 World Junior Ice Hockey Championships)
 Tournament MVP (2007 World Junior Ice Hockey Championships)
 WHL West first All-Star team for 2006–07 WHL season
 Del Wilson Trophy (WHL Top Goaltender)
 CHL Goaltender of the Year Award
 Calder Cup with the Hamilton Bulldogs
 Jack A. Butterfield Trophy (Calder Cup MVP)

2008
 NHL Rookie of the Month, March 2008
 NHL All-Rookie Team for 2007–08 NHL season

2009
 NHL YoungStars Game at 2009 NHL All-Star Game

2014
 Olympic gold medal in Men's Hockey at 2014 Sochi Olympics
 Best Goaltender at 2014 Sochi Olympics (voted by IIHF)

2015
 William M. Jennings Trophy (fewest goals allowed), (shared with Corey Crawford of the Chicago Blackhawks)
 Vezina Trophy (best goaltender)
 Ted Lindsay Award (most valuable player, voted by NHL Players Association)
 Hart Memorial Trophy (most valuable player, voted by Professional Hockey Writer's Association)
 NHL first All-Star team (voted by Professional Hockey Writer's Association)
 Lou Marsh Trophy (Canada's Top Athlete voted by a panel of journalists)
 Lionel Conacher Award (selected by sports writers of the Canadian Press)

2016
 Indspire Award (Sports)
 2016 World Cup of Hockey championship

2022
 Bill Masterton Memorial Trophy

See also
 List of NHL goaltenders with 300 wins

References

External links
 
 Carey Price biography at The Goaltender Home Page – advanced statistics and game logs
 "Price Steals the Show for Canada" by Bill Meltzer—NHL.com December 2, 2007
 "Carey Price: Continuing the legacy" by Shane Malloy—NHL.com June 2, 2006
 Hockey Canada player profile

1987 births
Living people
21st-century First Nations people
Bill Masterton Memorial Trophy winners
Canadian ice hockey goaltenders
Canadian philanthropists
Cariboo people
Dakelh people
First Nations sportspeople
Hamilton Bulldogs (AHL) players
Hart Memorial Trophy winners
Ice hockey players at the 2014 Winter Olympics
Indspire Awards
Lester B. Pearson Award winners
Medalists at the 2014 Winter Olympics
Montreal Canadiens draft picks
Montreal Canadiens players
National Hockey League All-Stars
National Hockey League first-round draft picks
Olympic gold medalists for Canada
Olympic ice hockey players of Canada
Olympic medalists in ice hockey
Quesnel Millionaires players
Ice hockey people from Vancouver
Tri-City Americans players
Vezina Trophy winners
William M. Jennings Trophy winners